Qazoqluy-e Olya (also Romanized as Qāzoqlūy-e ‘Olyā; also known as Qārqolū, Qāzeqlū, Qāzlu, Qāzoghlū-ye ‘Olyā, Qāzoqlū, and Qāzoqlū-ye ‘Olyā) is a village in Shivanat Rural District, Afshar District, Khodabandeh County, Zanjan Province, Iran. At the 2006 census, its population was 86, in 17 families.

References 

Populated places in Khodabandeh County